Donald Edward Geary (July 10, 1926 – July 22, 2015) was an American ice hockey player who competed in ice hockey at the 1948 Winter Olympics. Geary was a member of the American ice hockey team which played eight games, but was disqualified, at the 1948 Winter Olympics hosted by St. Moritz, Switzerland.

External links

Donald Geary's obituary

1926 births
2015 deaths
American men's ice hockey defensemen
Ice hockey players from Connecticut
Ice hockey players at the 1948 Winter Olympics
Olympic ice hockey players of the United States
People from Hamden, Connecticut